Henry Wells was an English academic in the late 14th and early 15th centuries.

Wells was born in Upwell. He was Rector of Grimston, Norfolk from 1399 to 1406; and Archdeacon of Lincoln from 1405 to 1431. Wells was Master of Trinity Hall, Cambridge from 1413 until 1429.

References

Archdeacons of Lincoln
1429 deaths
Masters of Trinity Hall, Cambridge
People from Upwell
15th-century English Roman Catholic priests